John M. Shaheen (1915 in Lee County, Illinois – 1 November 1985 in New York) was an American financier and businessman. He had been involved in oil and life insurance.

Career
Prior to World War II, Shaheen worked in publicity in Chicago. During World War II Shaheen was at the Office of Strategic Services, and was awarded the Silver Star and Legion of Merit. At OSS he was "chief of OSS Special Projects" and head of the Reports Declassification Section, and an advisor on the 1946 film O.S.S.. His friendship with William Casey, CIA Director under Ronald Reagan, derived from this period. Under President Richard Nixon, Shaheen was also "a special ambassador to Colombia".

Shaheen founded a life insurance business, selling life insurance from airport vending machines, before moving into the oil business. His oil industry activity included the Come By Chance Refinery in Newfoundland, Canada, which went bankrupt in 1976 owing around $500M, and was "one of the single largest bankruptcies in Canadian history to that date". In 1973 it was rumoured that Shaheen was going to found a newspaper, to be called the "New York Press". At the time his company, Shaheen Natural Resources, owned three radio stations and part of a television station, but had no experience in print media. It was reported in 1973 that he had made over $200M since World War II.

One of Shaheen's most memorable moments took place in the fall of 1974, when he chartered Queen Elizabeth 2 to bring dignitaries to a barren plot of land on the Nova Scotia mainland, opposite Bear Head, Cape Breton.  The inhabitants of the land had been cleared to make way for a large oil refinery, modeled on the Come By Chance refinery in Newfoundland, that Shaheen was promoting. The refinery was never built.

Shaheen was one of the principal contributors to Richard Nixon's campaign in 1968, and in the top 100 Republican donors in 1972, giving $100,000.

In 1981, Shaheen founded the Hong Kong Deposit and Guaranty Bank.

References

1915 births
1985 deaths
American businesspeople in the oil industry
People of the Office of Strategic Services
20th-century American businesspeople